The W. S. Blackwell House is a historic residence located at 211 Ft. Dale Street in Greenville, Alabama. The house was built around 1930, on land previously occupied by W. S. Blackwell's father-in-law's house, which burned in the 1920s.

Description and history 
The brick two-story Tudor Revival style home was designed by Montgomery architect Frank Lockwood, Jr., the son of renowned architect Frank Lockwood. The façade has a projecting, half-timbered front gable with a large multi-light window on the second floor, above the main entrance with a terra cotta surround and arch. On either side of the entrance are casement windows with decorative soldier course brick arches on the ground floor, and windows with dormer tops on the second floor. The interior also feature Tudor details, including a marble arched fireplace mantel in the living room and a cast iron staircase railing with spiral balusters.

The house was listed on the National Register of Historic Places on September 4, 1986.

References

National Register of Historic Places in Butler County, Alabama
Houses on the National Register of Historic Places in Alabama
Tudor Revival architecture in Alabama
Houses completed in 1930
Houses in Butler County, Alabama
Greenville, Alabama
1930 establishments in Alabama